Fasoula is a village in the Limassol District of Cyprus, located  north of Limassol.

References

Communities in Limassol District